St. Johnsbury is a census-designated place (CDP) corresponding to the main settled areas in the town of St. Johnsbury, Caledonia County, Vermont, United States. As of the 2020 census it had a population of 5,994, out of 7,364 in the entire town.

The CDP is in eastern Caledonia County, occupying the southern one-third of the town of St. Johnsbury. It includes the urban center of St. Johnsbury, the village of St. Johnsbury Center to the north up the valley of the Passumpsic River, and development along Route 2 to the east up the valley of the Moose River, but not as far as the village of East St. Johnsbury.

Interstate 91 passes through the west side of the CDP, with access from Exits 20, 21, and 22. I-91 leads north  to Newport and south  to White River. U.S. Routes 2 and 5 intersect in the center of the community. U.S. 2 leads west  to Montpelier, the state capital, and east  to Lancaster, New Hampshire, while U.S. 5 provides a local parallel route to I-91, leading north  to Lyndonville and south  to Wells River.

References 

Populated places in Caledonia County, Vermont
Census-designated places in Caledonia County, Vermont
Census-designated places in Vermont